Bojan Petrić (Serbian Cyrillic: Бојан Петрић, born 29 November 1984 in Slavonski Brod) is a Bosnian-Herzegovinian football player currently plays as a defender for Polet Brod.

Club career
Bojan Petrić was born in Slavonski Brod (SR Croatia, SFR Yugoslavia) a town on Sava river on the border with SR Bosnia and Herzegovina.  Still young, he moved to Bosanski Brod (name simply as Brod nowadays as part of the Republika Srpska, the Serbian entity within Bosnia), a town on the Bosnian side of the river, where he begin playing with local side FK Polet Bosanski Brod.

Already as senior, he played three seasons with Polet in the lower leagues, before moving in summer 2005 to FK Rudar Ugljevik who had just been relegated from the Premier League to the First League of the Republika Srpska, one of two Bosnian second flight leagues.  He played with Rudar for two seasons, before moving in summer 2007 to FK Borac Banja Luka in the Bosnia and Herzegovina Premier League.  He stayed with Borac until summer 2011, having been part of the 2010–11 championship winning squad.  For the 2011 season, he joined FK Novi Pazar in the Serbian SuperLiga.

In December 2011, he signed with the Malaysian club, T-Team FC In the 2012–2013 season, he played for Sheikh Russel KC in the Bangladesh Premier League from 2013.

In February 2017, Petrić signed with NK Zvijezda Gradačac. On 20 August 2017 Petrić announced on Instagram, that he had joined Turkish club İçel İdmanyurdu Spor Külübü. In November 2018, he posted pictures playing for another Turkish club, Mersin Büyüksehir Belediyesi Meskispor.

Ahead of the 2019–20 season, he returned to Polet Brod.

Honours
Sheikh Russel
Bangladesh Premier League (football): 2012–13
Independence Cup: 2012-13

Borac Banja Luka

Premier League of Bosnia and Herzegovina: 2010–11
Bosnia and Herzegovina Cup Winner: 2009-2010
First League of the Republika Srpska: 2007–08

References

External links
 
  at Utakmica
  Bangladesh Premier League

1984 births
Living people
People from Slavonski Brod
Association football defenders
Bosnia and Herzegovina footballers
FK Rudar Ugljevik players
FK Borac Banja Luka players
FK Novi Pazar players
Terengganu F.C. II players
Sheikh Russel KC players
FK Lovćen players
FK Tekstilac Derventa players
NK Zvijezda Gradačac players
OFK Grbalj players
First League of the Republika Srpska players
Premier League of Bosnia and Herzegovina players
Serbian SuperLiga players
Malaysia Premier League players
Bangladesh Premier League players
Montenegrin First League players
Bosnia and Herzegovina expatriate footballers
Expatriate footballers in Serbia
Bosnia and Herzegovina expatriate sportspeople in Serbia
Expatriate footballers in Malaysia
Bosnia and Herzegovina expatriate sportspeople in Malaysia
Expatriate footballers in Bangladesh
Expatriate footballers in Montenegro
Bosnia and Herzegovina expatriate sportspeople in Montenegro
Expatriate footballers in Turkey
Bosnia and Herzegovina expatriate sportspeople in Turkey